Architype Bayer is a geometric sans-serif typeface based upon the 1927 experimentation of Herbert Bayer. Bayer reacted to the Germanic use of capitalization for all nouns by abandoning uppercase. His new case combined characters based on the Carolingian minuscule with uppercase K rescaled to top-align on the mean line. The Bayer Architype typeface is one of a collection of several revivals of early twentieth century typographic experimentation designed by Freda Sack and David Quay of The Foundry.

See also
Architype Albers
Architype Aubette
Architype Renner
Architype Schwitters
Architype van der Leck
Architype Van Doesburg

References
Blackwell, Lewis. 20th Century Type. Yale University Press: 2004. .
Fleischmann, Gerd. Bauhaus Typographie. Oktagon Stuttgart: 1995. .
Haley, Allen. Type: Hot Designers Make Cool Fonts. Rockport Publishers Inc, Gloucester; 1998. 
Meggs, Philip. B and McKelvey, Roy. Revival of the Fittest: Digital Versions of Classic Typefaces. RC Publications; 2002.

External links
Architype Collections
Website for The Foundry
Website of Emotional Digital describing work by The Foundry

Geometric sans-serif typefaces